Luka Perković (born 30 September 1998), better known as Perkz (previously stylized as PERKZ and before that as PerkZ), is a Croatian professional League of Legends player for Team Vitality.

From 2015 to 2020, Perkz was a member of G2 Esports, when the team became the first European organization to win the Mid-Season Invitational in 2019. He reached the World Championship final in 2019, and is the only player to ever win eight LEC titles. In November 2020, Perkz left G2 to join LCS organization Cloud9 for the 2021 season. He is widely regarded as one of the best western players in League of Legends history.

Career

2014 season
Perkz's first professional team was GSI Gaming, which he joined midway through the 2013 season. With the team, he competed at DreamHack Summer 2014, though they did not make it past the group stage. Perkz and GSI Gaming won EpicGear Cup 16, and placed second in EpicGear Cup 17  before the team disbanded later on in the year.

2015 season
At the start of 2015, Perkz joined Gamers2. He participated at International Invitational Tournament 4 with the team, and later the EU CS Spring Qualifier r as along with beansu, Obvious, Kobbe and kaSing. Gamers2 were beaten by Team Nevo in the final of their qualifier bracket. Perkz then left the team, joining Millenium soon after.

With Millenium, Perkz and the roster finished 2nd at Gamers Assembly 2015 behind only Origen. Not long after, Perkz officially left the team.

In May 2015, it was announced that Perkz would be rejoining Gamers2, who had retained their Challenger Series spot for the EUCS Summer Season. In October, Gamers2 rebranded themselves to G2 Esports.

2016 season
G2 started strong in their first year as a part of the EU LCS. They finished the split in first place with a record of 15–3. In the playoffs, Perkz and G2 defeated established franchises Fnatic and Origen, 3–1 both times, to win the season and secure an invitation to 2016 Mid–Season Invitational.

Going into MSI, G2 Esports was not expected to win, with Korean representatives, SK Telecom T1 favored ahead of them, but were still expected to perform well. However, the team lost their first four games of the round robin and ultimately finished in fifth place out of six teams, and were eliminated from the tournament. This placement meant that Europe would forfeit their Pool 1 seed at the World Championship. In a statement published partway through the second day of play, G2 stated that their players had taken vacation time after a "rigorous Spring Split”. AD carry Emperor later stated that there had been an internal conflict within the team one day prior to the start of the event.

2019 season
In 2019 Caps was traded from Fnatic to G2, resulting in two mid lane players on the same team. Perkz swapped to the AD Carry position, replacing his teammate Hjarnan.  G2's 2019 season was very successful, with the team winning the Mid-Season Invitational, and making it to the 2019 League of Legends World Championship finals, where Perkz and the rest of G2 were defeated by FunPlus Phoenix.

2020 season
For the 2020 season, Perkz moved back to the mid lane, swapping positions with Caps. After the spring split had ended, Perkz swapped back to the bot lane.

In the middle of the LEC 2020 Summer Split, Perkz had to take a break because of stress. Perkz came back after a short break, and G2 Esports managed to once again win the LEC, and qualify for Worlds 2020.

At the 2020 League of Legends World Championship, G2 Esports were eliminated in the semifinals by the eventual champions, Damwon Gaming. This marked the third strait year G2 has finished fourth or better at Worlds. Following the loss, Perkz and G2 decided to part ways in November 2020.

2021 season
On November 20, 2020 Cloud9 announced Perkz as their new midlaner, replacing Nisqy. On Cloud9, Perkz reached the lock-in finals, and led Cloud9 to a first place finish in the regular season, as well as first place in the 2021 LCS MidSeason Showdown. Perkz was awarded Player of the Series for his performance in the finals against Team Liquid. Perkz is now the second player to have ever won both a LEC and a LCS championship title, along with his teammate Jesper "Zven" Svenningsen.

At the 2021 League of Legends World Championship Perkz and C9 reached the quarterfinals, where they lost to Gen.G.

Tournament results

G2 Esports
 1st— 2016 Spring EU LCS
 5th–6th— 2016 Mid-Season Invitational
 1st— 2016 Summer EU LCS regular season 
 1st— 2016 Summer EU LCS playoffs
 1st— 2017 Spring EU LCS regular season
 1st— 2017 Spring EU LCS playoffs
 2nd— 2017 Mid-Season Invitational
 2nd— 2017 Summer EU LCS regular season
 1st— 2017 Summer EU LCS playoffs
 2nd— 2018 Spring EU LCS regular season
 2nd— 2018 Spring EU LCS playoffs
 3rd–4th— 2018 League of Legends World Championship
 1st— 2019 LEC Spring regular season
 1st— 2019 LEC Spring playoffs
 1st— 2019 Mid-Season Invitational
 1st— 2019 LEC Summer playoffs
 2nd— 2019 League of Legends World Championship
 1st— 2020 LEC Spring regular season
 1st— 2020 LEC Spring playoffs
 3rd— 2020 LEC Summer regular season
 1st— 2020 LEC Summer playoffs
 3rd–4th— 2020 League of Legends World Championship

Cloud9
 1st — 2021 LCS Spring regular season
1st— 2021 LCS Mid-Season Showdown

Notes

References

Croatian expatriate sportspeople in Germany
G2 Esports players
League of Legends AD Carry players
League of Legends mid lane players
Millenium (esports) players
Living people
Cloud9 (esports) players
1998 births
Sportspeople from Zagreb